The Formica rufa group is a subgeneric group within the genus Formica, first proposed by William Morton Wheeler. This group contains the mound-building species of Formica commonly termed "wood ants" or "thatch-mound ants", which build prominent nests consisting of a mound of grass, litter, or conifer needles.  The species Formica rufa or the red wood ant is the type species of this subgroup.

This particular group can inhabit open deciduous woodlands, dense pine forests, and even moorland. They can produce formic acid in their abdomens and eject it  in the air when threatened. The only function of males is to mate in flight with queens. Species previously attributed to the Microgyna group were transferred to the  F. rufa group by the Wheelers in 1986.

Colonies
The genetic relationships in F. rufa group colonies can be complex. Colonies can be polygynous (having multiple queens) and these are often polydomous (having multiple nests per colony). Queens may be singly or multiply mated, and in polygynous colonies, may or may not be related. Colonies are rarely, if ever, independently formed. They either bud off from existing colonies, or are formed by temporary social parasitism of colonies of F. fusca or other closely related species. A wood ant queen ousts the existing queen, lays eggs, and the F. fusca workers raise her offspring until the nest is taken over. Some species in the F. rufa group sometimes form enormous "supercolonies" consisting of hundreds or thousands of nests. The largest documented example is an F. yessensis colony in Japan covering  containing an estimated 306 million workers and 1 million queens.

Member species
European species include:
Formica aquilonia Yarrow, 1955
Formica lugubris Zetterstedt, 1838
Formica paralugubris Seifert, 1996
Formica polyctena Förster, 1850
Formica pratensis Retzius, 1783
Formica rufa Linnaeus, 1761

North American species include:
Formica ciliata Mayr, 1886
Formica coloradensis Creighton, 1940
Formica comata Wheeler, 1909
Formica criniventris Wheeler, 1912
Formica dakotensis Emery, 1893
Formica fossaceps Buren, 1942
Formica integra Nylander, 1856
Formica integroides Emery, 1913
Formica laeviceps Creighton, 1940
Formica microgyna Wheeler, 1903
Formica mucescens Wheeler, 1913
Formica obscuripes Forel, 1886
Formica obscuriventris Mayr, 1970
Formica oreas Wheeler, 1903
Formica planipilis Creighton, 1940
Formica propinqua Creighton, 1940
Formica ravida Creighton, 1940
Formica reflexa Buren, 1942
Formica subnitens Creighton, 1940

Asian species
Formica yessensis

See also
Pissant

References

rufa species group
Insect species groups